Hostages is a tactical shooter  video game developed and published by Infogrames. It was released for the Acorn Electron, Archimedes, Atari ST, Amiga, Apple IIGS, Amstrad CPC, BBC Micro, Commodore 64, DOS, MSX, NES, and ZX Spectrum platforms in 1988. The game was released as Hostage: Rescue Mission in the United States and Operation Jupiter in France; the NES port is titled Rescue: The Embassy Mission.

Plot
A terrorist group have overrun an embassy in Paris. The player takes control of a six-man GIGN team on a mission to free the hostages.

Gameplay
The game is split into two or three (depending on platform) distinct sections:

In the first part of the game, the player must bring three men into position so they can snipe the building. While doing so, the men must avoid the searchlights by diving for cover in doorways, windows and behind fences as well as rolling, crawling and running. If the player is caught in a searchlight, the sniper is shot at and risks being gunned down.
The second part involves entering the building with the other three men. In some versions of the game, this section is linked to the first part. The player's men abseil down the side of the building to choose which room to enter from, while the snipers who were positioned earlier can be used to shoot the terrorists through the windows.
The building must then be searched, shooting the terrorists and finding the hostages in the process. In some versions of the game, hostages must be taken to a safe room.

Reception
Hostages was well-received by critics. The game received 5 out of 5 stars in Dragon. Computer Gaming World gave the PC version a positive review, noting poor joystick and keyboard response was a significant problem in an otherwise "great" game. Compute! called Hostages "one of the better Amiga combat games", noting that it did not involve aliens or swords.

Reviews
Atari ST User (Jan, 1989)
Raze (Mar, 1991)
Compute's Amiga Resource (Aug, 1989)
Crash! (Aug, 1990)
ST Format (Mar, 1993)
Raze (Jul, 1991)
Your Amiga (Jun, 1989)
CU Amiga (Sep, 1991)
The One (Oct, 1988)
The Games Machine (Apr, 1989)
ST/Amiga Format (Oct, 1988)
The Games Machine (Dec, 1988)
Tilt (Sep, 1990)
Joystick (French) (Apr, 1991)
The Games Machine (Oct, 1989)
Zzap! (Sep, 1989)
Your Sinclair (Oct, 1990)
The Games Machine (Apr, 1989)
Info (May, 1989)
Power Play (1989)
Power Play (Nov, 1988)
Zzap! (Italy) (Oct, 1989)
ACE (Advanced Computer Entertainment) (May, 1989)
ACE (Advanced Computer Entertainment) (Dec, 1988)
The Games Machine (Sep, 1990)
Computer and Video Games (Mar, 1991)
Mean Machines (Feb, 1991)
Antic's Amiga Plus (Aug, 1989)

Legacy
A sequel to Hostages, Alcatraz, was released by Infogrames for the Amiga, Atari ST, and MS-DOS in 1992.

References

External links

1988 video games
Acorn Archimedes games
Infogrames games
Action video games
Atari ST games
Amiga games
Apple IIGS games
Amstrad CPC games
BBC Micro and Acorn Electron games
Commodore 64 games
DOS games
First-person shooters
MSX games
Nintendo Entertainment System games
Stealth video games
Superior Software games
Tactical shooter video games
Video games about police officers
Video games about terrorism
Video games scored by Alberto Jose González
Video games developed in France
ZX Spectrum games
Video games set in Paris
Sniper video games
Piko Interactive games
Hostage taking in fiction
Single-player video games